This is a list of 1990 events that occurred in Romania.

Incumbents
President: Ion Iliescu
Prime Minister: Petre Roman

Politics
1990 Romanian general election.

Events

January 

 12 January – National Mourning Day in memory of the victims of the Revolution of 1989.
 20 January –  The first issue of Revista 22, published by the Group for Social Dialogue, appears in Bucharest.
 24 January – The poem "Un răsunet" written by Andrei Mureșanu (1848), on the music of Anton Pann, is selected  as the State Anthem of Romania under the name "Deșteaptă-te, române!".
 28 January – In Bucharest, in Victory Square, is held a meeting organized by PNȚCD, PNL, PSDR and other parties protesting against the decision of the FSN to participate in elections. In parallel, is conducted a counter-manifestation organized by FSN and supported by workers at IMGB, ICTB, IMMR and IIRUC.
 29 January – January 1990 Mineriad: Over 5,000 miners from the Jiu Valley arrive in the capital following calls launched in the media by President Ion Iliescu.

February 

 2 February
 The Romanian Society for Philosophy is reestablished.
 Bucharest Military Court pronounces judgment in the trial of four of Ceaușescu's close collaborators – Manea Mănescu, Tudor Postelnicu, Emil Bobu, and Ion Dincă: life imprisonment and total confiscation of personal property.
 5 February – The Museum of the Romanian Peasant is founded.
 6 February – Transformation of NSFC into a political party, under the name of National Salvation Front (NSF).
 15 February – The Theater Union of Romania is founded, with actor Ion Caramitru as president.
 28 February – February 1990 Mineriad: 4,000 miners from the Jiu Valley clash with law enforcers. Dozens of people are injured and 105 arrested.

March 
 11 March – The popular demonstration in Timișoara Opera Square begins, with protesters adopting the Proclamation of Timișoara.
 15 March – Five people are killed and hundreds injured in ethnic clashes between Romanians and Hungarians in Târgu Mureș.
 21 March – Romania applies to join the Council of Europe; the request was accepted on 7 October 1993.
 26 March – The Romanian Intelligence Service is established.

April 

 7 April – Ion Iliescu is elected President of the National Salvation Front.
 22 April – Golaniad: After an electoral rally of PNȚCD, some of the demonstrators barricade in the University Square, Bucharest.

May 
For six hours, Romanians were allowed to cross the Prut River in the  Moldavian SSR without passports and visas.
 20 May – Are held the first free elections in Romania after the Second World War. Turnout is over 90%. Ion Iliescu is elected President in the first ballot, receiving 85% of the votes.
 24 May – The Masca Theatre is founded by actor .

June 
 13 June – June 1990 Mineriad: Six people are shot dead and 746 injured after law enforcers, supported by miners, intervened in force against protesters in University Square and the civilian population.

July 
 24 July – The Senate of Romania adopts a bill which establishes the national holiday of Romania on 1 December, the day when, in 1918, through the union of Transylvania with Romania, was concluded the formation process of Romanian national state.

November 
 15 November – A large-scale demonstration on the occasion of three years from the anticommunist uprising of workers and residents of Brașov is held in the city. Led by members of the Association "15 November", demonstrators go through the old route of the demonstration in 1987.

Births 

 January 23 – Dorin Lazăr, rugby player
 January 27
 , singer and former member of Lala Band
 Mihai Onicaș, footballer
 February 9 – Alina Bercu, pianist
 February 27 – Constantin Drugă, footballer
 March 4 – Cristina Sandu, athlete
 March 15 – Octavian Ionescu, footballer
 March 16 – Ionuț Rada, footballer
 April 17 – Filip Lazăr, rugby player and kinesiologist
 June 1 – Bianca Perie, hammer thrower
 June 18 – Sandra Izbașa, Olympic gymnast
 August 20 – Ioan Valeriu Achiriloaie, alpine skier
 September 3 – Ovidiu Covaciu, footballer
 September 30 – Iuliana Paleu, sprint canoeist
 October 17 – Marius Copil, tennis player

Deaths 

 January 31 – Alexandru Tatos, director and screenwriter (b. 1937)
 February 15 – , mathematician and corresponding member of the Romanian Academy (b. 1927)
 February 20 – Alexandru Rosetti, spiritual patron of the Romanian school of linguistics (b. 1895)
 February 23 – Florin Pucă, graphic artist, poet and actor (b. 1932)
 April 17  – Paul Dimo, engineer and member of the Romanian Academy (b. 1905)
 July 31 – Nicolae Giosan, communist dignitary, agronomist, geneticist and member of the Romanian Academy (b. 1921)
 September 15 – Constantin Dinculescu, founder of the Romanian school of power plants (b. 1898)
 September 19 – , folk music and romances singer (b. 1917)
 October 1 – , literary critic, historian, and professor (b. 1941)
 November 13 – Mircea Ionnițiu, writer 
 December 20 – Valeriu Călinoiu, footballer (b. 1928)
 ? – Atanasia Ionescu, gymnast (b. 1935)

References 

Years of the 20th century in Romania
1990s in Romania
 
Romania
Romania